Carex subbracteata, the smallbract sedge, is a species of sedge that was first described by Kenneth Mackenzie in 1917.

References

subbracteata
Plants described in 1917